Mount Bradley is a mountain in Antarctica.

Mount Bradley may also refer to:
Mount Bradley (Siskiyou County, California)
Mount Bradley (Inyo County, California)
Mount Bradley (Flathead County, Montana)
Mount Bradley (Alaska)
Mount Bradley (Mount Jumbo), on Douglas Island